The Kota–Shri Mata Vaishno Devi Katra Weekly Express is an Express train belonging to West Central Railway zone that runs between  and  in India. It is currently being operated with 19803/19804 train numbers on a weekly basis.

Service

The 19803/Kota–Katra Weekly Express has an average speed of 46 km/hr and covers 1136 km in 24h 50m. The 19804/Katra–Kota Weekly Express has an average speed of 44 km/hr and covers 1881 km in 25h 50m.

Route and halts 

The important halts of the train are :

Coach composition

The train has standard LHB rakes with max speed of 110 kmph. The train consists of 19 coaches:

 1 AC II Tier
 3 AC III Tier
 6 Sleeper coaches
 6 General Unreserved
 2 Seating cum Luggage Rake
 1 High Capacity Parcel Van

Traction

Both trains are hauled by an Electric Loco Shed, Tuglakabad based WAP-7 throughout the entire journey.

Rake sharing

The train shares its rake with 19805/19806 Kota–Udhampur Weekly Express.

See also 

 Kota Junction railway station
 Shri Mata Vaishno Devi Katra railway station
 Kota–Udhampur Weekly Express

References

Notes

External links 

 19803/Kota–Katra Weekly Express India Rail Info
 19804/Katra–Kota Weekly Express India Rail Info

Transport in Kota, Rajasthan
Transport in Katra, Jammu and Kashmir
Rail transport in Jammu and Kashmir
Rail transport in Punjab, India
Rail transport in Haryana
Rail transport in Delhi
Rail transport in Rajasthan
Express trains in India
Railway services introduced in 2014